The Minca spiny rat (Proechimys mincae) is a species of rodent in the family Echimyidae. It is endemic to Colombia.

Phylogeny
Morphological characters and mitochondrial cytochrome b DNA sequences showed that P. mincae belongs to the so-called trinitatus group of Proechimys species, and shares closer phylogenetic affinities with the other members of this clade: P. trinitatus, P. guairae, P. poliopus, P. magdalenae, P. chrysaeolus, P. urichi, and P. hoplomyoides.

References

Proechimys
Endemic fauna of Colombia
Mammals of Colombia
Mammals described in 1899
Taxa named by Joel Asaph Allen
Taxonomy articles created by Polbot